Divo is an Indian-based record label  known for music and digital media productions.

History
Divo was established in 2014 as a startup online video company in South India. Since inception, the company has worked for well known musicians including A. R. Rahman, Dhanush, Anirudh Ravichander, Yuvan Shankar Raja and many others.

Services
Divo offers video and music distribution, marketing and copyright management for film studios, TV channels, musicians and music platforms. The company also offers reputation management for brands, celebrities, and films.

Discography
The record label has a catalogue of released albums it has worked on. The table below chronicles some of them:

See also
Think Music India
Sony Music India

References

Indian record labels
Indian music record labels
Indian companies established in 2013
Music companies of India